Saint-cyriens may refer to:

 Saint-cyriens (officers), cadet officers of l'école spéciale militaire de Saint-Cyr
 Saint-cyriens (Paris), inhabitants of Saint-Cyr-l'École
 Saint-cyriens (Seine-et-Marne), inhabitants of Saint-Cyr-sur-Morin